Street Lady is an album by American trumpeter Donald Byrd released on the Blue Note label in July 1973, with Larry Mizell returning as producer, following the success of its predecessor.

Reception
The Allmusic review by Stephen Thomas Erlewine awarded the album 3 stars and stated "the appeal of Street Lady is how its polished neo-funk and pseudo-fusion sound uncannily like a jive movie or television soundtrack from the early '70s — you can picture the Street Lady, decked out in polyester, cruising the streets surrounded by pimps with wide-brimmed hats and platform shoes. And while that may not be ideal for jazz purists, it's perfect for kitsch and funk fanatics".

Track listing
All compositions by Larry Mizell/Byrd except as indicated
 "Lansana's Priestess" - 7:39  
 "Miss Kane" - 6:20  
 "Sister Love" - 6:11  
 "Street Lady" (Larry Mizell, Fonce Mizell) - 5:40  
 "Witch Hunt" - 9:42  
 "Woman of the World" (Larry Gordon, Larry Mizell) - 6:51

Personnel
Donald Byrd - trumpet 
Roger Glenn - flute
Jerry Peters - piano, electric piano
Fonce Mizell - clavinet, trumpet, vocals
Fred Perren - synthesizer, vocals
David T. Walker - guitar
Chuck Rainey - electric bass
Harvey Mason - drums
King Errisson - congas and bongos
Stephanie Spruill - percussion
Larry Mizell - vocals, arranger, conductor

References

Blue Note Records albums
Donald Byrd albums
1973 albums
Albums produced by the Mizell Brothers
Jazz-funk albums